Ardboe is a large parish civil parish in east County Tyrone, Northern Ireland. It borders the western shore of Lough Neagh and lies within the Mid Ulster District Council area. It is also the name of the local civil parish, which incorporates both Mullinahoe and Moortown.

Ardboe Development Association, which developed a small business park, and Ardboe Community Group are based in the Mullinahoe part of the parish.

The name "Ard Boe" means "high cow" comes from a legend that the monastery of Ardboe was built from the milk of a magic cow which emerged from nearby Lough Neagh.

History
During the Second World War, in 1941, an RAF station was built in the townland of Kinrush in Ardboe. RAF Cluntoe was initially used by the Royal Air Force, but quickly handed over as a training station for the United States Army Air Forces, and by 1943, over 3,500 troops were stationed there. By 1946 the war was over and the Americans had left. The RAF kept the airfield ticking over and it was reopened in 1952 as a training station for pilots going to the Korean War. By 1955 it closed for good. Remains of the Cluntoe Airfield around Ardboe can still be seen, with the area known as "The Drum" among locals.

The Troubles
For more information see The Troubles in Ardboe, which includes a list of incidents in Ardboe during the Troubles resulting in two or more fatalities.

Places of interest 
One of the finest examples of the Irish High cross in Ulster, can be found in the parish of Ardboe and is located on a small hillock close to the shores of Lough Neagh. Ardboe High Cross, which dates to the 9th/10th century, is all that now remains of a 6th-century monastery, which was established by Saint Colman mac Aed. The Cross, made of sandstone, stands about eighteen feet high. Although well weathered with some structural damaged, Ardboe High Cross is a wonderful example of figure carving, incorporating 22 panels of sculpture of biblical events.
The adjoining graveyard was the site of a tree, known locally as the Pin Tree, which people had traditionally inserted coins or pins, believing it to cure them of ailments. The tree was blown down during the Boxing Day storms of 1998.
The Battery Harbour, in the townland of Ardean, with public access to Lough Neagh, is the base for Lough Neagh Rescue. and fishing boats and visiting yachts and [pleasure boats.
Coyle's Cottage located at "Keerie's Corner" which is a T-junction in Anneeterbeg is a 300-year-old restored fisherman's cottage. It is the home of the Muintirevlin Historical Society and Gort Moss Walking Club and hosts music nights and traditional music classes. The Kinturk Cultural Centre located in Anneeterbeg is a wonderful for both locals and tourists to enjoy for information, dining and bar facilities.

Townlands
Arboe civil parish contains the following townlands (four of which are in County Londonderry):

Notable people
Provisional Irish Republican Army member Matt Devlin who took part in the 1981 Irish Hunger Strike and was later a leading member of Sinn Féin in County Westmeath
Tyrone Gaelic footballers Tommy McGuigan, Brian McGuigan and their father, Frank McGuigan, Patsy McNally, Eugene Devlin and James Og Devlin and Denis Rocks are from the area.
Polly Devlin, author, journalist, broadcaster and film-maker.
Kyle Coney, Tyrone minor Gaelic player 
Screenwriter and member of the Horslips, Barry Devlin, whose My Mother and Other Strangers is set in Moybeg, a fictional village on Lough Neagh which was based on Ardboe

Communications 
Telephone Numbers in the Ardboe area either begin with 867 Coagh or 877 Stewartstown. Most numbers begin with 867 however 877 applies to those around most of the Carnan area and some of the Killycoply area.

Sport 
St. Malachy's GAC and Ardboe O'Donnovan Rossa GAC are the local Gaelic Athletic Association clubs. Many previous gaelic football clubs existed including St.John's Mullan and Kinturk.

Census 2011 
Ardboe is a very large parish. Is Classified A Small Village By The NI Statistics and Research Agency (NISRA): there were 986 people living there in 2011.
69% of the population was from a *Roman Catholic* background
20% of the population was from a *Protestant* background 
3% of the population had *no* religion 
8% of the population was from a *foreign* country 
63% of the population was aged 18 – 75
30% of the population was aged 0 – 18
7% of the population was aged 75+ 
59% of the population were female 
41% of the population were male
36% of the population were unemployed

See also
 Abbeys and priories in Northern Ireland (County Tyrone)
 List of villages in Northern Ireland
 List of towns in Northern Ireland
List of civil parishes of County Tyrone

References

External links 

 Parish website

Villages in County Tyrone
Civil parishes of County Tyrone
Civil parishes of County Londonderry